Lago Musters Airport  is a public use airport just northwest of Sarmiento, a town in the Chubut Province of Argentina.

See also

Transport in Argentina
List of airports in Argentina

References

External links 
OpenStreetMap - Lago Musters Airport
OurAirports - Lago Musters Airport

Airports in Argentina
Chubut Province